Walk the Angry Beach (also known as Hollywood After Dark and The Unholy Choice) is a 1968 American exploitation drama film written, produced and directed by John Hayes.

Plot
It stars Rue McClanahan as Sandy, a stripper who aspires to become an actress but ends up being taken advantage of by the industry.

Cast
 Anthony Vorno as Tony
 Rue McClanahan as Sandy
 John Barrick as Tom
 Paul Bruce as Nick
 Ernest Macias as Ernest
 Lea Marmer as Mrs. McVea
 Leslie Moorhouse as Shakespearean
 Doug Rideout as Fitz
 Joanne Stewart as Patti

Home media
In 2006, the film was released as a double feature DVD with another McClanahan film, The Rotten Apple by Something Weird Video.

In 2007, it was featured as part of the short-lived Mystery Science Theater 3000 spin-off direct-to-DVD series The Film Crew.

See also
List of American films of 1968
Girl in Gold Boots - 1968 exploitation film featured on Mystery Science Theater 3000

References

External links
 
 
 The Film Crew treatment on ShoutFactoryTV

1968 films
1960s English-language films
1960s exploitation films
1968 drama films
American drama films
Films set in Los Angeles
American exploitation films
Films directed by John Hayes
1960s American films